The Lightweight competition was the five-lowest weight featured  at the 2009 World Amateur Boxing Championships, and was held at the Mediolanum Forum. Lightweights were limited to a maximum of 60 kilograms in body mass.

Medalists

Seeds

  Idel Torriente (quarterfinals)
  Hrachik Javakhyan (second round)
  Serdar Hudayberdiev (quarterfinals)
  Yakup Kılıç (first round)
  Miklós Varga (second round)
  Domenico Valentino  (champion)
  Albert Selimov (semifinals)
  José Pedraza (final)

Draw

Finals

Top Half

Section 1

Section 2

Bottom Half

Section 3

Section 4

See also
Boxing at the 2008 Summer Olympics – Lightweight

External links
Draw

Lightweight